The following are the national records in athletics in Croatia maintained by the national athletics federation of Croatia, Croatian Athletics Federation (HAS).

Some of the Croatian records in athletics predate Croatia's declaration of independence from Yugoslavia in 1991, and the formation of the Croatian Athletics Federation in 1992. These records, set by Croatian athletes competing for Yugoslavia, were retroactively ratified as Croatian records.

Since 1993, only the results achieved at competitions with doping control according to the IAAF rules are ratified as senior men's and women's national records.

Outdoor 

Key to tables:

+ = en route to a longer distance

h = hand timing

X = unratified due to no doping control

Men

Women

Mixed

Indoor

Men

Women

Notes

References
General
Croatian Records - Outdoor 6 November 2021 updated
Croatian Records - Indoor 30 January 2021 updated
Specific

External links 
 HAS web site 

Croatia
Records in athletics

Athletics